Plagiotremus goslinei, the biting blenny, Gosline's fangblenny, scale-eating blenny or the scale-eating fang blenny, is a species of combtooth blenny found in coral reefs in the eastern central Pacific Ocean.  This species reaches a length of  SL. The specific name honours the American ichthyologist William A. Gosline (1915-2002) of the University of Hawaiʻi.

References

goslinei
Fish described in 1956